Marijuana use is commonly thought to enhance sexual pleasure. There is limited scientific research on the effects of marijuana and sex, however, and it is not well understood. The lack of research is in part due to U.S. drug policies centered on prohibition. In addition, the effects are difficult to study because sexual arousal and functioning are in themselves extremely complex and differ among individuals. Moreover, marijuana affects people differently. As a result, it is challenging to study. Men and women report greater sexual pleasure after having consumed marijuana, but there is no direct scientific evidence of the effects on the physiological components of the sexual response cycle when using the drug.

Research
Research of the effects of marijuana and sex on humans is so far limited to self-report studies. This type of study has disadvantages because it requires people to accurately remember how much they consumed and its effects, while researchers have no way to verify responses. In these studies, the majority of men and women who consumed marijuana prior to sex reported they experienced greater pleasure than without it. Researchers believe this reported increase in sexual pleasure with marijuana is likely a result of the drug’s effects on the senses. In particular, it commonly makes users feel more relaxed.

There is some research that suggests the amount of marijuana consumed affects the experience. In one study, 59% of users thought that sexual pleasure was enhanced after smoking one joint. Less than half (39%), however, thought that consuming more than one joint provided further enhancement. In addition, large doses of marijuana have been used as a sexual depressant in India.

It is not clear if marijuana consumption affects the quality of orgasms. Just over half of male consumers and a lower percentage of female consumers reported that it enhanced their orgasms. In a small study published in 1979 of 84 graduate students, the majority of which were men, those who reported being “experienced smokers” believed that it increased the intensity of an orgasm and should be considered an aphrodisiac. A number of more recent studies do suggest orgasms are improved with marijuana use, however.

Studies on marijuana consumption’s effects on sex have shown little other significant physical improvements. Masters and Johnson completed a five year long study in 1979, with a sample size of 800 men and 500 women whose ages ranged between 18 and 30 years old. In this study, men reported no improvements in maintaining erections or an increase of penile firmness. Women reported no increase of vaginal lubrication.

A more recent study in 2017 in the Journal of Sexual Medicine, looked at data from the large nationally representative National Survey of Family Growth and included more than 28,000 women and nearly 23,000 men. It reviewed survey responses on how frequently they had consumed marijuana and had sex in the four weeks prior to the survey. It found that women who consumed cannabis daily had an average of 7.1 sexual encounters in the previous four weeks compared to 6 for those who never consumed it. Men who consumed marijuana daily reported having sex 6.9 times on average compared to 5.6 times in those men who never consumed it.

There has also been some evidence of negative effects on marijuana use on sex. Some studies show a correlation between chronic marijuana use and reduced testosterone levels in men. Furthermore, it has been found that heavy use of marijuana decreases the sperm count of healthy men. This reduction in sperm count can be reversed. Chronic use of marijuana is also linked to a decrease in sexual performance, while increasing sexual arousal.

Influence of Cannabis 
The effects of Cannabis begins as a chemical process in the brain in which the Neural Communication Network becomes altered. THC's chemical structure is similar to the brain chemical Anandamide, which is responsible for sending chemical messages between neurons throughout the nervous system. The brain areas that are affected influence memory, pleasure, thinking, concentration, movement, coordination, and sensory and time perception. These areas include the amygdala, hippocampus, basal ganglia, and prefrontal cortex, and within those areas are cannabinoid receptors that makeup a part of the Endocannabinoid system.

Such affects within the nervous system, may vary among individuals. However, Cannabis will influence experiences in sexual pleasure and memory in distinctive ways. Studies have been conducted observing differences between male and female neuropsychological functioning. While the results have shown little significant differences, there have been limited studies conducted for very small sample sizes.

Sexual Pleasure 
Once the cannabinoid receptors are activated by THC, dopamine, a chemical linked with the affects of our reward system, is released. The areas of the brain that govern sexual functioning that are then influenced by the released dopamine, can result or cause increased sexual pleasure.  Most studies conducted to understand this influence from cannabis are limited and consist of small sample sizes. Furthermore, these studies are survey studies and rely on participants ability to recall details of such experiences. However, two studies show results that reveal a majority of participants had increased desire for sex, increased sensitivity of sensations, and increased sexual satisfaction.

Majority of participants in survey studies report having increased sexual pleasure and the desire to have sex. A study published in March 2019 observing women using cannabis prior to sex and their sexual function, measured outcomes of satisfaction in sexual domains of drive, orgasm, lubrication, dyspareunia, and sexual experience and the frequency of marijuana use on satisfaction. The results of the study show women who used cannabis prior to having sex had higher odds of satisfactory orgasms and an increase in sex drive. Women having frequent marijuana use had higher odds of satisfactory orgasms, regardless of use prior to sex or not. Such results show, that cannabis shares a relationship to increased sexual satisfaction positively, and such results can be considered to further research to develop treatment for female sexual dysfunction. Another study, had a large portion of participants report having increased desire and sexual satisfaction using cannabis before sex or using cannabis for sex, while some reported the experience being worse than usual. Overall reports, show the rewards of reaching orgasm quicker and better sensations when having sex under the influence of cannabis.

Memory 
The orbitofrontal cortex and hippocampus help with the formation of new memories, and cannabinoid receptors are found in these areas as well. Thus, cannabis will have an affect in abilities regarding memory and learning for individuals. While using cannabis for the purpose of enhancing sexual experience and satisfaction, there are other areas that cannabis will influence regarding perception and sensation. Studies conducted observe neurocognitive behavior of individuals under the influence of cannabis and the relationship of cannabis with risky-behavior.

Cannabis can have more negative affects when it comes to learning and memory. A user will show lower spans of attention, concentration, and abstract reasoning. Neurocognitive functioning becomes impaired due to the use of cannabis and the user loses the ability to recall or learn effectively while under the influence. This can hinder ones responses to the surrounding environment and decision-making, which can lead to situations where the individual can not remember details accurately or their perception of time becomes distorted. While such results are studied, the neurocognitive domains remain to be inconsistent in results when observing neurocognitive behavior of users. One study observed the risky-behavior of individuals who use cannabis. The findings of the study revealed that adolescents who use cannabis are more likely to voluntarily engage in unprotected sex repeatedly, while the participants who never used cannabis or started to use cannabis after adolescence were less likely to have unprotected sex.

Products
There are a variety of cannabis-infused sex products, such as lubricants and massage oils containing CBD and THC.

References

External links

 

Cannabis
Human sexuality